David Stuttard is a British theatre director, classical scholar, translator, lecturer on classical literature and history, and author, primarily of historical works on the ancient world .

Biography
Stuttard read Classics at the University of St Andrews and taught the subject for eleven years. As well as being a professional lecturer and author, in 1993 he founded the touring theatre company Actors of Dionysus, which specializes in classical Greek drama. From 1993 to 2004 he was co-Artistic Director with Tamsin Shasha and directed his own translations and adaptations at venues in the UK and abroad. He has also written dramatic reconstructions of the lost Euripides plays Alexandros and Palamedes, which were premiered as part of 'The Trojan Trilogy' at the British Museum in April 2008. He teaches at University College London Workshops and at the Ancient and Classical Worlds Summer School at The University of Cambridge.

Published works

References

External links
 Personal website

Scottish classical scholars
Scottish theatre directors
Alumni of the University of St Andrews
Living people
Year of birth missing (living people)
Place of birth missing (living people)
Translators of Ancient Greek texts
British theatre directors